Aida Hoteit  is a Lebanese architect, academic and scholar. She is a Professor of Architecture and Urban Planning and the Director of the Faculty of Fine Arts and Architecture at the Lebanese University. Hoteit is a Fellow of the Royal Society of Arts.

Education
Hoteit received a BA with Honors in Clinical Psychology and a DES with Honors in Architecture from the Lebanese University in 1988 and 1989, respectively. After moving to Spain, she attained an MPhil in Social Psychology from the Complutense University of Madrid in 1992 and a PhD summa cum laude in Architecture/Urban Planning from the Polytechnic University of Madrid in 1993.

Career
Hoteit served as an Architect and the Chairperson of the Department of Urban Planning at the Ministry of Public Works and Transport (Lebanon) between 1995 and 2000. 
Since 1993, she has been conducting academic work at the Lebanese University Faculty of Fine Arts and Architecture, where she is currently a professor and director. She served as the Chairperson of the Department of Architecture twice from 2001 to 2003 and 2015 to 2019.

Awards
Hoteit is a Fellow of the Royal Society of Arts (2019).

References

Living people
Date of birth missing (living people)
Lebanese architects
Year of birth missing (living people)
Academic staff of Lebanese University